, is a Japanese composer and was the chair of the Japanese Society for Rights of Authors, Composers and Publishers (JASRAC) from 12 August 2010 to 31 March 2016. In April 2021, he was appointed commissioner of the Japanese Agency for Cultural Affairs.

Early life 
Tokura began playing the violin at age 4. He spent his elementary and high school years in Germany where he gained a basic music education.

Education 
Tokura debuted as a composer while still a student at the Faculty of Law at Gakushuin University. He further studied composition, conducting as well as screening and studio production in the United States and the United Kingdom.

Career 
Tokura served as a member of the Council for Cultural Affairs, a managing director for the Japan Composer's Association (JACOMPA), a director for the All Japan Authors and Composers’ Association and the Japan Composers & Arrangers Association, and an advisor to the Song Writer's Union of Japan.

On 7 December 2017 it was announced that Tokura would conduct the closing theme to the 68th NHK Kōhaku Uta Gassen (68th NHK Red & White Song Festival), 31 December 2017. The theme, "Hotaru no Hikari", was to have been conducted by Masaaki Hirao but Tokura replaced him following Hirao's death in July.

In March 2021, he was appointed commissioner of the Agency for Cultural Affairs following a decision by the Japanese government at a Cabinet meeting, effective on 1 April 2021.

Selected works 
 Carmen '77 (Pink Lady)
 UFO (Pink Lady)
 Out of the Blue (musical)
 Johnny Eno Dengon (Pedro & Capricious)
 Dounimo Tomaranai (Brenda Vaughn)
 Azusa 2 Gou (Karyudo)

References

External links 
 

1948 births
Gakushuin University alumni
Japanese composers
Japanese male composers
Japanese musical theatre composers
Living people
Male musical theatre composers
Musicians from Tokyo